Nada Jabado,  is a Professor of Pediatrics at McGill University, and a physician at the Montreal Children's Hospital. She is a fellow of the Royal Society of Canada, the 2011 winner of the William E. Rawls Prize of the Canadian Cancer Society, and the 2020 winner of the Dr. Chew Wei Memorial Prize in Cancer Research of the University of British Columbia.

Most cited papers
(s part of a group) 
Schwartzentruber J, Korshunov A, Liu XY, Jones DT, Pfaff E, Jacob K, Sturm D, Fontebasso AM, Quang DA, Tönjes M, Hovestadt V. ... N. Jabado Driver mutations in histone H3. 3 and chromatin remodelling genes in paediatric glioblastoma. Nature. 2012 Feb;482(7384):226-31. According to Google Scholar, it has been cited 1871 times.   
Sturm D, Witt H, Hovestadt V, Khuong-Quang DA, Jones DT, Konermann C, Pfaff E, Tönjes M, Sill M, Bender S, Kool M.... N. Jablo.  Hotspot mutations in H3F3A and IDH1 define distinct epigenetic and biological subgroups of glioblastoma. Cancer cell. 2012 Oct 16;22(4):425-37. According to Google Scholar, this article has been cited 1400  times    
Jones DT, Jäger N, Kool M, Zichner T, Hutter B, Sultan M, Cho YJ, Pugh TJ, Hovestadt V, Stütz AM, Rausch T.  .. N Jabno. Dissecting the genomic complexity underlying medulloblastoma. Nature. 2012 Aug;488(7409):100-5. According to Google Scholar, this article has been cited764    times

References

External links

Year of birth missing (living people)
Living people
Academic staff of McGill University